Escola de Belas Artes (School of Fine Arts) is one of the centers of the Federal University of Rio de Janeiro and dates back to colonial times.

A royal letter of Nov 20 1800 by John VI of Portugal established the Aula Prática de Desenho e Figura in Rio de Janeiro. It was the first institution in Brazil systematically dedicated to teaching the arts. During colonial times, the arts were mainly of religious or utilitarian nature and were learnt in a system of apprenticeship.

The Decree of Aug 12, 1816 created the Escola Real de Ciências, Artes e Ofícios (Royal School of Sciences, Arts and Crafts), which established an official education in the fine arts. Then it was renamed as the Academia Imperial de Belas Artes (Imperial Academy of Fine Arts), instituting a system of artistic education that would greatly influence the development of Brazilian art. 

On Nov 8 1890, the old Imperial Academy was transformed into the Escola Nacional de Belas Artes (National School of Fine Arts). In 1931, the School joined the University of Rio de Janeiro, the current Federal University of Rio de Janeiro.

Notable students 
Artur Barrio (1945- ), conceptual artist
Affonso Eduardo Reidy (1909-1964), architect
Arthur Timótheo da Costa (1882– 1922), Afro-Brazilian painter 
Lúcio Costa (1902-1998), Brazilian architect and urban planner
Rubens Gerchman (1942-2008), painter and sculptor
Oswaldo Goeldi (1895-1961),  artist and engraver 
Anna Maria Maiolino (1942- ), Italian plastic artist
Burle Marx (1909-1994), landscape architect
Victor Meirelles (1832-1903), painter
Ismael Nery (1900-1934), poet and painter
Oscar Niemeyer (1907-2012), architect
Lygia Pape (1927-2004), sculpture, engraving, and filmmaking
Candido Portinari (1903-1962), painter
Franz Weissmann (1911-2005), Austrian sculptor

External links 
Escola de Belas Artes (School of Fine Arts of Federal University of Rio de Janeiro)
 

Rio de Janeiro
Federal University of Rio de Janeiro
1816 establishments in Brazil
Arts organizations established in the 1810s